Nikolai Vasilyevich Kalinin (Russian: Николай Васильевич Калинин; 10 March 1937 – 7 March 2008) was a Red Army Colonel general. He commanded the Soviet airborne from August 1987 to January 1989, after which Kalinin became the commander of the Moscow Military District. In August 1991, he supported the coup d'état attempt and was relieved of command after the coup failed. After retiring in 1993, Kalinin died on 7 March 2008.

Early life 
Kalinin was born on 10 March 1937 in Malye Kurashki village in the Lyskovsky District of Gorky Oblast.

Military service 
In 1958, Kalinin graduated from the Leningrad Suvrov Officer School. He was a platoon and company commander. In 1968, he graduated from the Frunze Military Academy. From 1968 to 1969, Kalinin was a battalion commander in the 111th Guards Airborne Regiment. In 1970, he became chief of staff of the regiment, and its commander in 1972. In the same year, he transferred to become deputy commander of the 105th Guards Airborne Division. Kalinin commanded the 7th Guards Airborne Division between 1973 and 1975. In 1977, he graduated from the Military Academy of the General Staff, after which Kalinin became a corps commander. In 1979, he became an army commander. From 1983 to 1985, he was the deputy commander of the Carpathian Military District. Kalin was appointed deputy commander of the Group of Soviet Forces in Germany in 1985. In 1986, he was transferred to lead the Siberian Military District. In August 1987, he became the commander of the Soviet airborne. In January 1989, Kalinin became the commander of the Moscow Military District. After assisting the  State Committee on the State of Emergency during the August Coup in 1991, Kalinin was replaced by Vladimir Mikhailovich Toporov. On 20 August, Kalinin declared a curfew in Moscow.

Later life 
Kalinin died on 7 March 2008 at the age of 70, three days before his 71st birthday.

References 

1937 births
2008 deaths
Soviet colonel generals
People from Lyskovsky District
Burials in Troyekurovskoye Cemetery
Recipients of the Order of the Red Banner
Recipients of the Order "For Service to the Homeland in the Armed Forces of the USSR", 2nd class
Frunze Military Academy alumni
Commanders of the Soviet Airborne Forces
Military Academy of the General Staff of the Armed Forces of the Soviet Union alumni